Mortonsville may refer to the following places in the United States:

 Mortonsville, Kentucky
 Mortonsville, Indiana